Acacia declinata is a shrub of the genus Acacia and the subgenus Plurinerves that is endemic to an area along the south coast in south western Australia.

Description
Like most species of Acacia it has phyllodes rather than true leaves. It blooms from August to September and produces yellow flowers.

Taxonomy
The species was first formally described by the botanists Richard Sumner Cowan and Bruce Maslin in 1990 in the work A new species of Acacia from Western Australia as published in the journal the Western Australian Naturalist. It was reclassified as Racosperma declinatum by Leslie Pedley in 2003 then returned to genus Acacia in 2014.

Distribution
It is native to an area in the Great Southern region of Western Australia where it is found growing in loamy or sandy clay soils. It is found in an area between Borden in the north west, Manypeaks in the south west and Boxwood Hill in the south east where it is often a part of tall shrubland a woodland communities.

See also
List of Acacia species

References

declinata
Acacias of Western Australia
Taxa named by Bruce Maslin
Plants described in 1990
Taxa named by Richard Sumner Cowan